Milan Đurić (born 20 June 1977) is a Serbian politician and lawyer serving as the mayor of Novi Sad since 26 October 2022. A member of the Serbian Progressive Party (SNS), Đurić was the deputy mayor from 2020 to 2022.

Early life and education 
Đurić was born on 20 June 1977 in Novi Sad, SAP Vojvodina, SR Serbia, SFR Yugoslavia. He graduated from "Jovan Popović" elementary school and "Isidora Sekulić" gymnasium. In 2002, he graduated from the Faculty of Law at the University of Novi Sad.

Law career 
From 2003 to 2005, he was a trainee lawyer, and since 2005 he has been a lawyer in an independent law firm.

Political career 
Đurić is a member of the populist Serbian Progressive Party (SNS).

From 2012 to 2020, he was a member of the Social and Economic Council of Novi Sad, a member of the City Council of Novi Sad for administration and regulations, and from 2016 a member of the Provincial Electoral Commission. In September 2020, he was elected deputy mayor of Novi Sad. He was appointed mayor of Novi Sad, succeeding Miloš Vučević who was appointed deputy prime minister and defence minister.

Personal life 
Đurić is married to Mirjana Đurić. He served in the main board of FK Vojvodina and was a member and vice-president of the Assembly of FK Vojvodina. Besides his native Serbian, he speaks English.

References 

1977 births
Living people
Serbian Progressive Party politicians
Politicians from Novi Sad
Mayors of Novi Sad
21st-century Serbian politicians
University of Novi Sad alumni